The Hawaiian Mission Houses Historic Site and Archives Honolulu, Hawaii, was established in 1920 by the Hawaiian Mission Children's Society, a private, non-profit organization and genealogical society, on the 100th anniversary of the arrival of the first Christian missionaries in Hawaii. In 1962, the Mission Houses, together with Kawaiahao Church, both built by those early missionaries, were designated a U.S. National Historic Landmark (NHL) under the combined name Kawaiahao Church and Mission Houses. In 1966 all the NHLs were included in the National Register of Historic Places.

The Hawaiian Mission Houses Historic Site and Archives collects, preserves, interprets, and exhibits documents, artifacts, and other records of Hawaii's "missionary" period from about 1820 to 1863. It interprets its historic site and collections and makes these collections available for research, educational purposes, and public enjoyment. The archive's collection holds over 3,000 Hawaiian, Western, and Pacific artifacts, and more than 12,000 books, manuscripts, original letters, diaries, journals, illustrations and Hawaiian church records. The historic site and archive is open Tuesday through Saturday from 10:00 a.m. to 4:00 p.m. The general admission charge is $12, with discounts for students, seniors, and the military.

Houses
The evolution of Mission House architecture illustrates the progressive adaptation of missionaries from New England to the climate, culture, and building materials they encountered in the Sandwich Islands.

Oldest Frame House
The materials to build the Oldest Frame House (Ka Hale Lāau 'the wood house') arrived by ship around Cape Horn from Boston in 1821. They had already been measured and cut, ready to assemble into a frame house suitable for the climate of New England: with small windows to help keep the heat inside and short eaves so as not to risk cracking under a load of snow.

Though principally occupied by the seven members of Daniel Chamberlain's family, it often housed as many as five other missionary families, along with occasional ailing sailors or orphans. The small parlor served as a schoolhouse, and the basement served as the dining hall. The cookhouse was a separate building.

Chamberlain House
The Chamberlain House (Ka Hale Kamalani) was built in 1831 from materials procured locally: coral blocks cut from reefs offshore and lumber salvaged from ships. Designed by the mission's quartermaster, Levi Chamberlain, to hold supplies as well as people, it had two stories, an attic, and a cellar. The windows are larger, more numerous, and shuttered against the sun. The building now serves as the main exhibition hall for the Museum.

Print House
In 1841, a covered porch and balcony were added to the frame house, and an extra bedroom was built next door out of coral blocks. Both additions show further adaptation to an indoor-outdoor lifestyle appropriate to the climate. The extra coral building later became the mission's Print House (Ka Hale Pai) and now serves as a museum exhibit to show how the missionaries and native Hawaiians worked together to produce the first materials printed in the Hawaiian language.

Gallery

See also
List of the oldest buildings in Hawaii

References

 Sandler, Rob, Julie Mehta, and Frank S. Haines (2008). Architecture in Hawai'i: A Chronological Survey, new edition. Honolulu: Mutual Publishing.
 Simpson, MacKinnon (1998). Museum Homes of Honolulu: A Guidebook. Honolulu: Mission Houses Museum.

Museums in Honolulu
Institutions accredited by the American Alliance of Museums
Museums established in 1920
Hawaiian architecture
History museums in Hawaii
National Historic Landmarks in Hawaii
1920 establishments in Hawaii
National Register of Historic Places in Honolulu